The 44th New York Infantry Regiment was a regiment of the Union Army during the American Civil War which was formed up in mid-1861, and mustered in on August 30, 1861.  The regiment wore an americanized zouave uniform which consisted of a dark blue zouave jacket with red piping on the cuffs, dark blue trousers with a red stripe, a red zouave shirt, a dark blue forage cap, and a pair of leather gaiters.  The jacket had buttons down the front of it which was not part of the original French zouave uniform.

Service
The regiment was first mustered by Stephen W. Stryker, a former lieutenant in the 11th New York Volunteer Infantry Regiment, in part to remember his former commander, Colonel Elmer Ellsworth in Alexandria, Virginia, the first officer to die in the war. The regiment became known as "Ellsworth's Avengers". Several other members of the regiments were members of Ellsworth's Chicago Zouave Cadets, including Colonel Freeman Conner, Major Edward B. Knox and Captain Lucius Larrabee, who commanded Company B and was killed at Gettysburg.

The regiment first saw action in the Peninsular Campaign and by October 1862, battle deaths and disease had left only 200 men of the regiment's original strength of 1100 members.

They were one of four regiments in the 3rd Brigade, 1st Division, V Corps, Army of the Potomac, commanded by lieutenant colonel Strong Vincent, which fought during the Battle of Gettysburg. On July 2, 1863, at around 4:00 p.m., the second day of the battle, the 3rd Brigade began a heroic defense of Little Round Top, the extreme left flank of the Union Line.

The 44th New York mustered out on October 11, 1864, with the veterans and recruits being transferred to the 140th and 146th New York Volunteers.

Commanders
Colonel Stephen W. Stryker
Colonel James Clay Rice
Colonel Freeman Conner

See also
List of New York Civil War regiments
John B. Weber

Notes

References
 Ingraham, Charles A (1925). Elmer E. Ellsworth and the Zouaves of '61. Chicago, Illinois: University of Chicago Press.
The Civil War Archive

External links
New York State Military Museum and Veterans Research Center - Civil War - 44th Infantry Regiment History, photographs, table of battles and casualties, and historical sketch for the 44th New York Infantry Regiment.
 

Infantry 044
1861 establishments in New York (state)
Military units and formations established in 1861
Military units and formations disestablished in 1864